James Calvert Spence College is a coeducational community school and sixth form located in Amble in the English county of Northumberland. The school is named after Sir James Calvert Spence, a decorated war hero and paediatrician.

The school was formed in 2011 from the merger of Amble Middle School, Druridge Bay Community Middle School and Coquet High School. Today the school is based over two sites - South Avenue (lower school for pupils in years 5 to 7, who are aged 9 to 12) and Acklington Road (upper school for pupils in years 9–13, who are aged 12 to 18). The school is administered by Northumberland County Council and has an intake of pupils from Acklington, Amble, Broomhill, Hadston, Red Row, Warkworth and Widdrington.

James Calvert Spence College offers GCSEs and BTECs as programmes of study for pupils, while students in the sixth form have the option to study from a range of A-levels and further BTECs.

References

External links
James Calvert Spence College official website

Upper schools in Northumberland
Community schools in Northumberland
Middle schools in Northumberland
Educational institutions established in 2011
Amble
2011 establishments in England